Martin Loo (born 9 April 1988) is an Estonian cross-country mountain biker. He also competes in cyclo-cross.

Major results
2007
 1st  National Cross-country Championships
2012
 1st  National Cross-country Championships
2013
 1st  National Cross-country Championships
2014
 1st  National Cross-country Championships
2015
 1st  National Cyclo-cross Championships
2016
 1st  National Cyclo-cross Championships
2017
 1st  National Cross-country Marathon Championships
 1st  National Cyclo-cross Championships
2018
 1st  National Cyclo-cross Championships

References

External links

1988 births
Living people
Estonian male cyclists
Cyclo-cross cyclists
Cross-country mountain bikers
European Games competitors for Estonia
Place of birth missing (living people)
Cyclists at the 2015 European Games